Conus timorensis, common name the Timor cone, is a species of sea snail, a marine gastropod mollusk in the family Conidae, the cone snails and their allies.

Like all species within the genus Conus, these snails are predatory and venomous. They are capable of "stinging" humans, therefore live ones should be handled carefully or not at all.

Description
The size of the shell varies between 13 mm and 50 mm. The smooth shell is striate towards the base. Its color is rosy white, with orange-rose clouds and distant revolving series of spots.

Distribution
This species occurs in the Indian Ocean off the Mascarenes; also off Timor, Flores and New Guinea.

References
Notes

Sources
 Drivas, J.; Jay, M. (1987). Coquillages de La Réunion et de l'Île Maurice. Collection Les Beautés de la Nature. Delachaux et Niestlé: Neuchâtel. . 159 pp.

External links
 The Conus Biodiversity website
 Cone Shells – Knights of the Sea
 

timorensis
Gastropods described in 1792